Desulforhopalus singaporensis is a bacterium from the genus of Desulforhopalus which has been isolated from sulfidic mud from Singapore.

References

Bacteria described in 2000
Desulfobacterales